African Change Academy (ACA) is a minor political party in South Africa.

The party was founded by United Democratic Movement founder member Wandile Tsipa, who was expelled from the UDM after being accused of using that party's resources to start his new party.

ACA advocates for the return of the death-penalty, with Tsipa stating that "the only people against the death sentence are those who do criminal activities."

In November 2017, the party called for the dismissal of the Minister of State Security, Bongani Bongo, accused of involved in a bribery scandal, by then president Jacob Zuma.

The party contested the 2019 South African general election at provincial level in the Eastern Cape only, failing to win a seat.

Election results

Provincial elections

! rowspan=2 | Election
! colspan=2 | Eastern Cape
! colspan=2 | Free State
! colspan=2 | Gauteng
! colspan=2 | Kwazulu-Natal
! colspan=2 | Limpopo
! colspan=2 | Mpumalanga
! colspan=2 | North-West
! colspan=2 | Northern Cape
! colspan=2 | Western Cape
|-
! % !! Seats
! % !! Seats
! % !! Seats
! % !! Seats
! % !! Seats
! % !! Seats
! % !! Seats
! % !! Seats
! % !! Seats
|-
! 2019
| 0.03% || 0/63
| - || -
| - || -
| - || -
| - || -
| - || -
| - || -
| - || -
| - || -
|}

References

Political parties in South Africa
Political parties established in 2017